COVID-19 vaccination in Ontario began in December 2020, when the first doses of the Pfizer vaccine were administered. In February 2021, shipments for both the Pfizer and Moderna vaccines increased significantly. By May 2021, over 50 percent of Ontarians had received their first dose.

Timeline of rollout

Early rollout 
On December 9, 2020, Health Canada approved the Pfizer–BioNTech COVID-19 vaccine. Vaccines were distributed amongst the provinces by the Federal government. Ontario received an initial delivery of 6,000 doses of the Pfizer vaccine of a total of 90,000 to be received before the end of 2020. On December 14, 2020, the first vaccination was delivered in Ontario in Toronto, kicking off a vaccination rollout.

Vaccinations began on December 14, 2020, in a pilot program to vaccinate health-care workers working in long-term care homes and later expanded to front-line health-care workers. Ontario's vaccination task force later announced their plan to inoculate all long-term care home residents and staff in Toronto, Peel, York and Windsor-Essex with a goal date of January 21, 2021. The government expanded this to all long-term care home residents in the province by February 15.

On December 23, 2020, Health Canada approved the mRNA-1273 COVID-19 vaccine developed by Moderna. The first tranche of vaccines of a total 53,000 designated for Ontario by the end of 2020 arrived at Toronto Pearson International Airport on December 24.

Over the Christmas and holiday season, many vaccination clinics were paused. The Ontario government has been criticized for this delay, the government officially responded that the cessation was due to staff shortages. Rick Hillier, in charge of the Ontario vaccine task-force later apologized, calling the cessation a "mistake". On December 29, 2020, he added that the task-force was looking into applying single doses of the Moderna vaccine in order to inoculate even more people more efficiently.

On January 15, 2021, it was announced all LTC homes in Toronto had been vaccinated. On January 19, 2021, the provincial government announced all LTC residents and staff in hot zones had received at least their first dose. By February 14, 2021, the province announced it had completed at least first-dose vaccinations in all long-term care homes in Ontario.

Manufacturing delays 
Due to manufacturing delays with Pfizer (aimed at retooling to expedite vaccine production), Ontario received a significant decline in vaccine delivery between late January and early February. On January 29, 2021, another delay was announced with Moderna, who announced that a 20–25 percent cut in product would be delivered to Canada for the month of February.

On January 28, 2021, the Ontario government announced a major miscalculation in reported fully vaccinated people, over-reporting the number of fully vaccinated individuals.

Regular shipments and approval of new vaccines 
By late February 2021, shipments for both Pfizer and Moderna increased significantly. On February 26, 2021, the Oxford–AstraZeneca COVID-19 vaccine was approved for use by Health Canada and on March 5, 2021, the Janssen COVID-19 vaccine was approved for use by Health Canada. Johnson & Johnson only requires one shot for administration.

Shipments of the Oxford-AstraZeneca vaccine arrived in the province on March 3, 2021. The government announced the creation of a pilot programme for administration through Ontario pharmacies to begin March 9, 2021. The vaccines would originally only be used on those between the ages of 60 and 64 due to a lack of study on the vaccine's efficacy on adults over 65 years of age. The pilot will take place in 380 pharmacies in Toronto, Kingston and Windsor-Essex. The first shot of Oxford-AstraZeneca vaccine was given March 10 in Toronto. Registration began in the three regions at Shoppers Drug Mart, Rexall and Costco pharmacies. The province announced another pilot programme involving family doctors administering the vaccine beginning March 13, 2021, in six regions: Hamilton, Toronto, Wellington-Dufferin Guelph, Peterborough, Simcoe-Muskoka and Peel Region.

On March 22, 2021, it was announced restaurant workers (mostly young individuals) would be prioritized in Phase 2 of the provincial vaccine rollout.

In anticipation for moving into Phase 2 of the vaccine rollout in the province, vaccination appointments for older citizens in late March 2021 were hard to fill, partly due to both vaccine hesitancy and the online spread of misinformation by older populations. This misinformation was exacerbated by NACI's opinion reversal on the safety of the Oxford-AstraZeneca vaccine and its potential side-effects of blood clots in post-vaccination embolic and thrombotic events. Due to recommendations from NACI, on March 29, 2021, Ontario later restricted use of AstraZeneca to those adults aged 55 years and older.

Transition to Phase 2 
Following the departure of General Rick Hillier as the chair of the vaccine task-force on March 31, 2021, he was replaced by Doctor Homer Tien (head of Ornge and a trauma surgeon).

With a steady influx of vaccine shipments, the province began to open up eligibility, especially in the Greater Toronto Area. Ontario officially moved to "Phase 2" of its vaccine rollout strategy on April 6, 2021. The first of these province-wide announcements included vaccinating adults with high-risk health conditions.

Following a sharp rise in new cases, exacerbated by COVID-19 variants, the province shifted focus to hotspot regions, particularly focused in Peel Region and Toronto, opening up eligibility to all adults aged 18 and older in certain postal codes.

In April, the Ford government was criticized by the opposition for leaving out much higher-risk neighbourhoods through the choice of 114 postal codes for prioritization of vaccination for those 18 years of age and older. The government responded saying it was an unnecessary politicization of the issue and that the postal codes were chosen from a study done by the Ontario Science Advisory Table. The Advisory Table responded by saying they had chosen the postal codes to study, but did not recommend to the Progressive Conservative government that they prioritize those postal codes. Instead, they had recommended targeting age groups in specific hotspot neighbourhoods, using the postal codes as a metric to measure COVID-19 statistics.

Lowering of age limits and vaccine ramp-up 
Following the lowering of the age of 55 to 40 on April 20, 2021, for access to the Oxford-AstraZeneca vaccine, Ontario began to achieve vaccination number milestones. On April 21, 2021, Ontario recorded 136,695 doses administered the previous day. The shots were not being taken by the older population due to a combination of vaccine hesitancy and a preference for the two mRNA vaccine brands, which has been called "vaccine shopping". Vaccine Hunters Canada has been credited with the rapid uptake of the vaccine in Ontario among members of Generation X.

On April 22, 2021, pregnant women were added to Phase 2's "highest risk" category for vaccine eligibility in Ontario after advocacy from Ontario OBGYNs and other medical professionals.

The Ontario government announced in late April new accelerated changes to the vaccine rollout due to increased supply. Ontario now plans to open first dose vaccine appointments to all Ontario adults aged 18 and older province-wide starting May 18, 2021, one week ahead of the original target for the week of May 25.

On May 5, 2021, Health Canada announced the approval of the Pfizer–BioNTech COVID-19 vaccine for use in individuals ages 12 and older, previously they were only authorized for individuals ages 16 and older. In response to this, Ontario began offering the vaccine to this younger age group in several Ontario hotspots such as Toronto as of May 18, 2021 along with the entirety of Peel Region as of May 20 and plans to open up vaccine appointments for those aged 12 and older province-wide effective May 23, 2021.

Passing 50 percent vaccination rate and second dose strategy 
In May 2021, 50 percent of Ontarians had received their first dose of a vaccine.

On May 28, 2021, the provincial government released their plans for shortened intervals for second doses, beginning with those aged 80 and older, moving to those between the ages of 70 and 79 and moving on first-dose date-based system using a first in, first out principle. The shortest intervals could be shortened from 16 weeks to 28 days.

On June 7, 2021, Ontarians aged 70 years and older and those who received their first dose of an mRNA vaccine became eligible to book a second dose.

Second dose strategy and continuation of efforts 
By July 2021, most Ontarians are able to return to a manufacturer-recommended dose interval (21 days between shots of Pfizer-BioNTech, 28 days between shots of Moderna).

Following a slowdown of Pfizer-BioNtech deliveries in late June, mixing of the two mRNA vaccines had become commonplace depending on supply, and receiving an mRNA vaccine if one had received the Oxford-AstraZeneca vaccine has their first had become common place, with an interval being reduced from 12 weeks between shots to 8. Some vaccine hesitancy occurred about the mixing of vaccine brands.

Third dose and further continuation of efforts 

Amid the rapid rise in cases from the Omicron variant, the Ontario government announced that Ontarians can receive a third dose of a COVID-19 vaccine as a booster shot beginning in December 2021.

On March 1, 2022, proof of vaccination is no longer mandatory as the number of active cases dropped, though the government began offering a fourth dose of a COVID-19 vaccine as a second booster shot. On March 19, 2022, Vaccine Hunters Canada closed its own operations exactly one year after its establishment as over 80 percent of the national population eligible for vaccination has been vaccinated and thus served its purpose.

Vaccine progress 

Data as of December 4, 2021; does not include booster shots

Phases for vaccine rollout

Former vaccine task force members 
On August 31, 2021, the vaccine task force was dismissed.
 Dr. Homer Tien, trauma surgeon and president and CEO, Ornge (chair)
 Mario Di Tommaso, deputy solicitor general, Community Safety, commissioner of Emergency Management (vice-chair)
 Helen Angus, deputy minister of Health (vice-chair)
 Ontario regional chief RoseAnne Archibald of Taykwa Tagamou Nation
 Dr. Isaac Bogoch, infectious diseases consultant and internist, Toronto General Hospital
 Dr. Dirk Huyer, Ontario's chief coroner
 Angela Mondou, president and CEO, Technation
 Mark Saunders, former Toronto Police Chief
 Dr. Maxwell Smith, bioethicist and assistant professor, University of Western Ontario
 Dr. Regis Vaillancourt, director of Pharmacy, Children's Hospital of Eastern Ontario

Resigned 
 Linda Hasenfratz, CEO of Linamar, resigned due to her travel outside of the country in December 2020
 General (retired) Rick Hillier, former chief of Defence Staff for the Canadian Forces (chair), stepped away from role following the end of his contract on March 31, 2021
 Dr. Kieran Moore, Former Medical Officer of Health, Kingston, Frontenac, Lennox & Addington Public Health stepped away from the role to become chief medical officer of Health for Ontario

See also 
 COVID-19 pandemic in Ontario
 COVID-19 vaccination in Canada
 COVID-19 vaccination in Quebec

References 

Deployment of COVID-19 vaccines
COVID-19 pandemic in Canada